The lifesaving events  at the 2001 World Games in Akita was played between 24 and 26 August.  90 athletes from 9 nations participated in the tournament. The competition took place in Akita Prefectural Pool for pool events and in Iwaki Island Park for beach events. For both men and women, there were four individual events in pool lifesaving, three individual events in beach lifesaving, and an overall team event combining five non-medal team and relay events in pool and beach disciplines.

Participating nations

Medal table

Events

Men

Women

References

External links
 International Life Saving Federation
 Lifesaving on IWGA website
 Results

 
2001 World Games
2001